Portrait of Pier Luigi Farnese is a heavily-damaged 1546 oil on canvas painting of Pier Luigi Farnese, Duke of Parma by Titian, now in Room 2 of the National Museum of Capodimonte.

It was produced on the artist's return to Venice from Rome in 1546. Its subject was a son of Pope Paul III, dressed in the armour and accoutrements of a papal gonfaloniere. He was stabbed to death in 1547 in a plot instigated by the Landi and Anguissola families on the advice of the duke of Milan Ferrante I Gonzaga.

References

Paintings in the collection of the Museo di Capodimonte
Farnese, Pier Luigi
Farnese, Pier Luigi
Farnese, Pier Luigi
1546 paintings
Farnese Collection